The Pedi sheep is a breed of sheep native to South Africa. And is one of three of indigenous type of sheep, along with Zulu and Swazi, they have been in the region since 200-400 AD. The breed gets its name and characteristics from having been raised primarily by the Pedi people in the north of the country. Pedi are smaller fat-tailed sheep kept for meat, are polled, and are generally white, brown, and red.

References

External links
 Bapedi Sheep Breeders Society of South Africa

Sheep breeds originating in South Africa
Sheep breeds